Kristopher David Negrón (born February 1, 1986) is an American former professional baseball player and current first base coach of the Seattle Mariners. He played in Major League Baseball (MLB) for the Cincinnati Reds, Arizona Diamondbacks, Seattle Mariners and Los Angeles Dodgers. He played all four infield and all three outfield positions, although he split most of his time between shortstop and center field.

Early life
Negrón was born in New Jersey and later attended Vanden High School in Fairfield, California. He played baseball, football, and track in high school. His mother, Mary, is Dominican, and his father, Dan, is Puerto Rican. He got a baseball scholarship to University of California, Davis but lost it due to poor grades after one year. He transferred to Cosumnes River College in Sacramento, California and in 2006 hit .361 with 78 runs scored and 31 steals. He was selected by the Boston Red Sox in the seventh round, 223rd overall, of the 2006 Major League Baseball draft.

Professional Baseball

Boston Red Sox
Negrón started his first professional season batting .234 in his first 25 games for the rookie class Gulf Coast League Red Sox.  However, over the final 16 games he hit .292 with two home runs and 10 runs batted in. He was promoted to the Class-A short season Lowell Spinners on August 26. In 2007, Negron started the season with the Class-A Greenville Drive. He posted a .226 average with three home runs and 29 RBIs. He was promoted to the Class-A Advanced Lancaster JetHawks on August 31. He stole two bases in three games for the JetHawks.

Back in Greenville for the 2008 season, Negrón hit .244 over 92 games. He showed his speed, stealing 25 bases and hitting five triples while scoring 50 runs. Negrón played three games for the Double-A Portland Sea Dogs during a brief July call-up and finished the season with the Lancaster JetHawks again. In 33 games, he hit .328 with seven home runs and 19 RBIs. The JetHawks made the playoffs, and Negrón went 10-for-39 with two homers and seven RBIs in nine games, capped off with a 10th inning, three run walk-off homer in game two of the California League semifinal series.

Negrón showed strong numbers against left-handed pitching in 2008, hitting a combined .355 with a .600 slugging percentage. He finished the season with a total combined average of .265. He set career highs with eight home runs, 24 doubles and 46 RBIs. Negrón spent the first 111 games of his 2009 season with the Salem Red Sox, the new Class-A Advanced team of the Red Sox. He hit .264 with three homers and 34 RBIs.

Cincinnati Reds
Negrón was traded to the Cincinnati Reds on August 14, 2009, for shortstop Álex González and cash. After eight games with the Sarasota Reds, he was promoted to the Double-A Carolina Mudcats. He hit .241 in 54 at-bats. In 2010 for the Mudcats, Negrón hit .272 in 470 at-bats. Although his power numbers slightly dropped to six home runs and 41 RBIs, his on-base percentage increased to .344. He was promoted to Triple-A Louisville late in the season and went 4-for-21. Following the 2010 season, he played for the Peoria Saguaros in the Arizona Fall League and was placed on the Reds 40-man roster. He spent all of 2011 with Louisville, where he hit .216 in 123 games.

Negrón began 2012 with Louisville, but on June 6 he was called up for the first time to the Major Leagues, and made his Reds' debut the next day as a pinch-runner against the Pittsburgh Pirates. On June 14, he got his first Major League hit, a single off Scott Barnes, in the bottom of the fifth inning at Great American Ballpark in Cincinnati. He returned to Louisville after four appearances with the Reds, where he had the one hit in four at-bats. Negrón hit .218 with six homers and 20 RBIs at Louisville until he tore the anterior cruciate ligament and medial meniscus in his right knee on July 5, costing him the rest of the season. On November 30, 2012, he was non-tendered by the Reds and removed from the 40-man roster but he agreed to a minor league contract with them for the 2013 season that included an invitation to major league spring training. In 2013, all at Louisville, he hit .225 with five homers and 30 RBIs. He played for Criollos de Caguas in the Puerto Rican Winter League after the season.

Playing in Louisville in 2014 and batting .269 for the Bats, in early July he was called up to the big leagues for the second time in his career, this time to fill in for the injured Brandon Phillips. On July 13, Negrón, who was starting at second base, hit his first big-league home run, off starter Francisco Liriano, and tallied his first three RBIs against the Pittsburgh Pirates. His playing time was significant for the injury-ravaged Reds; he made the most of it with a three-game stretch against the Cleveland Indians August 5–7, going a combined 7–15 with two doubles, one home run and five RBIs. On August 15 against the Colorado Rockies, he had his first four-hit game, going 4–4 with four singles and one RBI. Overall, he hit .271 with six homers and 17 RBI in 49 games for the Reds in 2014. In 2015, he split the season between Louisville and Cincinnati, hitting .216 in 59 games for Louisville and .140 in 43 games for the Reds. His season ended early when he suffered a partially dislocated shoulder, fractured scapula and torn labrum while making a catch at Great American Ball Park on September 8. He was released by the Reds in October and became a free agent.

Chicago Cubs
After spending the off-season rehabbing from his shoulder injury, Negrón signed a minor league contract with the Chicago Cubs that included an invitation to spring training. He did not make the major league club and spent the entire season with the AAA Iowa Cubs, where he hit .256 in 117 games with nine homers, 46 RBI and 23 steals.

Arizona Diamondbacks
In November 2016, Negrón signed a minor league contract with the Arizona Diamondbacks. He was assigned to the Reno Aces of the Pacific Coast League, where he hit .300 in 120 games with 13 homers and 64 RBI. The Diamondbacks called him up to the majors in September He had four hits in 25 at-bats (.160) for the Diamondbacks that season in 14 games. He was added to the Diamondbacks roster for the Wild Card Game and 2017 NLDS but did not play. He was outrighted off the roster after the season but re-signed to a new minor league deal and invited to spring training. He was assigned to Reno to begin 2018, but was called up by the Diamondbacks on June 4, 2018 and appeared in two games for them on June 4 and June 5 against the San Francisco Giants, with one hit in three at-bats before he was designated for assignment on June 6 and outrighted back to the minors.  He hit .283 in 118 games for Reno during the year.

Seattle Mariners
On August 30, 2018, Negrón was traded to the Seattle Mariners for cash considerations and he was added to the major league roster on September 1. He batted .219/.242/.313 for the year. For the season, he had the fastest baserunning sprint speed of all major league third basemen, at 29.5 feet/second. He was outrighted to the AAA Tacoma Rainiers on March 13, 2019 when he did not make the roster out of spring training In 82 games for Tacoma, he hit .310 wit 12 homers and 61 RBI. On July 16, the Mariners selected his contract and brought him back to the majors where he hit .217 in 10 games.

Los Angeles Dodgers
On July 9, 2019, Negrón was traded to the Los Angeles Dodgers in exchange for minor league infielder Daniel Castro. In his first at bat with the team, Negron hit a home run off Kyle Freeland of the Colorado Rockies. He played in 30 games for the Dodgers, hitting .259.

Post playing career
Negrón announced his retirement from professional baseball on November 12, 2019. On November 19, 2019, Negrón was hired by the Seattle Mariners as assistant to the director of player development. On January 27, 2021, Negrón was announced as the manager for the Triple-A affiliate of the Mariners, the Tacoma Rainiers, for the 2021 season. The Rainiers finished the season with 78 wins, making them the Triple-A West Champions, and Negrón was named  Triple-A West manager of the year. 

In 2022, he began serving as first-base coach for the Mariners. On April 20, he made his debut as the interim major-league manager, while manager Scott Servais was unavailable after testing positive for COVID-19. The Mariners beat the Texas Rangers that day under Negrón's management.

Personal 
Negrón and his wife, Allison, met in 2005 as students at UC Davis and married in 2010. They have twin sons, Gianni and Lorenzo, who were born in June 2021. They live in Napa, California.

References

External links

1986 births
Living people
People from Willingboro Township, New Jersey
Baseball players from New Jersey
Major League Baseball third basemen
Major League Baseball second basemen
Cincinnati Reds players
Arizona Diamondbacks players
Seattle Mariners players
Los Angeles Dodgers players
Cosumnes River Hawks baseball players
Gulf Coast Red Sox players
Liga de Béisbol Profesional Roberto Clemente infielders
Liga de Béisbol Profesional Roberto Clemente outfielders
Lowell Spinners players
Greenville Drive players
Lancaster JetHawks players
Portland Sea Dogs players
Salem Red Sox players
Sarasota Reds players
Carolina Mudcats players
Louisville Bats players
Peoria Saguaros players
Criollos de Caguas players
Iowa Cubs players
Reno Aces players
Tacoma Rainiers players
Seattle Mariners coaches